White Mountain, is a mountain with an elevation of  in Sevier County, Utah although a long ridge of it extends northwestward into Sanpete County, at  .

References

Mountains of Utah
Mountains of Sevier County, Utah